In Uganda, the Leader of the Opposition (LOP) is the leader of the largest political party in the Parliament of Uganda that is not in government. The Leader of the Opposition appoints and heads an alternative shadow cabinet whose duty it is to challenge and influence governmental actions and legislation on the floor of Parliament.

The current Leader of the Opposition is Mathias Mpuuga of the National Unity Platform.

History of the opposition in the Parliament of Uganda

Pre-independence

After Uganda had been colonised in 1894 as a British Protectorate, the British rulers introduced the Legislative Council (Legco) in 1921, whose overall mission was to enact appropriate laws for the Protectorate. However it was not until 1945 that the first 3 indigenous Ugandans were allowed to sit in the Legco. When the struggle for independence intensified in the early 1950s, an opposition side in the Legco began to emerge.

The year 1958 saw two important milestones emerge in Uganda's political history. That is when the first direct elections to the Legco were held and the position of "Leader of the Opposition" formally created in the same institution. The major concerns of the opposition during those years were preparing the country for independence, including putting in place an appropriate national constitution.

In March 1960, Obote became the first president of the Uganda People's Congress (UPC) which was born from the merger of the Uganda National Congress (UNC) and the Uganda People's Union (UPU) which had been established in 1959 by some members of the Legco. This event further strengthened Obote's  position in national politics. So, after the April 1961 elections which enabled the Legco to be transformed into the "National Assembly"  and the Democratic Party (DP) to get into power, Obote became the first Ugandan Leader of the Opposition. On 1 March 1962, Ben Kiwanuka, the DP leader became the first Prime Minister of Uganda. Unfortunately, two months later, the DP lost power in the April 1962 elections which Obote's UPC won with the assistance of Kabaka Yekka (KY) Party in Buganda. In May 1962, Obote became the second Prime Minister and the National Assembly was converted into a Parliament. Subsequently, Milton Obote became the first executive President of Uganda from 1966 until 1971.

Post-independence

During the first four years since independence (1962-1966), DP was the only party on the opposition benches in Parliament and it was not only fighting against the injustices of the UPC-KY coalition government but also fighting for its own survival. The Leader of the Opposition was Basil Kiiza Bataringaya, the then Secretary General of DP, hailing from Western Uganda in what was then known as Bushenyi District. But after the abrogation of the 1962 Constitution in Parliament and the death of the UPC-KY alliance in May 1964, Basil Kiiza Bataringaya crossed over to UPC with a number of his fellow DP Members of Parliament, leaving the Opposition side heavily depleted.

Between 1964 and 1971, the Leader of the Opposition was Alex Latim from Gulu who replaced Bataringaya as the DP Secretary General. During the following years, Latim together with his fellow DP colleagues and some of the KY and UPC members who had crossed to the Opposition side continued to fight bravely for the survival of the Opposition. Among other things, the Opposition put up a spirited fight against the harsh detention laws which had been imposed on the country, emerging corruption in the Obote regime and development towards one party rule.

The fall and rise of Obote

The Parliament of Uganda effectively ceased to function for 8 years when General Idi Amin had seized power in a coup d'état in January 1971. The Amin regime preferred to rule through decrees and regular military announcements. As a result, most of the UPC and DP politicians went underground or kept a very low profile, while others fled into exile. Obote himself fled to Tanzania.

Following the overthrow of the Amin regime in April 1979 by Tanzanian troops and some Ugandan exiles, Parliament was restored under the name 'National Consultative Council (NCC)' whose responsibilities not only included enacting new laws for the country, but also supervising the executive systematically in order to prevent the reappearance of dictatorial rule. The NCC however did not divide itself into "Government" and "Opposition" sides. Instead it operated as a multi-party umbrella organisation under Uganda National Liberation Front (UNLF) which sought to reach consensus on each issue on non-ideological and non-party basis.

The first post-independence elections were held in December 1980 during which Obote and his UPC was voted into power. But the elections were hotly disputed although Dr. Paul Kawanga Ssemogerere, the new DP Leader and his fellow DP MPs reluctantly accepted to it in the Opposition benches. Dr. Ssemogerere thus became Uganda's fifth Leader of the Opposition. The Opposition vociferously condemned the escalation of Uganda's external debt, general insecurity and violation of basic human rights of ordinary Ugandans. They were also alleged to be sympathetic to the guerrilla activities which were started especially in the Luweero Triangle by the National Resistance Movement (NRM) led by Yoweri Kaguta Museveni (the current President), Uganda Freedom Movement (UFM) led by Andrew Kayira and Uganda Freedom Fighters (UFF) led by Robert Serumaga.

Second fall of Obote and rise of NRM

Again in July 1985, Milton Obote and his second UPC government were overthrown in a military coup led by General Tito Okello Lutwa who also closed Parliament. But it was re-opened in February 1986 under a new name, "National Resistance Council (NRC)", a month after the NRM had grabbed power. As was the case in the NCC in 1979–1980, there was no official Opposition in the NRC. The NRC was originally the supreme policy organ of the NRM during the bush war of 1981 to 1986. it is the same group that constituted itself into a Parliament, maintaining the name NRC

After the 1996 Presidential and Parliamentary elections, the NRC was renamed Parliament but up to 2006, said Parliament and the whole of Uganda operated under a disguised single-party state called the "Movement System" that would later be defined in the High Court as a one-party state. As a result, there was also no parliamentary opposition (and thus no formally recognized Leader of the Opposition) in Parliament from July 1985 to May 2006.

Return to multiparty system
What acted as opposition were associations such as the Young Parliamentary Group and the Parliamentary Forum (PAFO). faced with both national and international pressures, President Museveni was forced to open up the political space. A referendum was held in July 2005 and the majority voters preferred a return to multiparty politics. The 2006 elections were thus the first multiparty elections, 20 years after the NRA/M takeover.

In this election, the Forum for Democratic Change (FDC) became the main opposition party. Subsequently, Prof. Morris Ogenga Latigo from Acholi became the sixth Leader of the Opposition in the 8th Parliament.

Coming in as MP for Agago County, Prof. Latigo led the Opposition in the House at a time when politicians in Uganda were still suffering a strong hangover of the Movement System in which members operated on individual merit. Transforming from that system into the loyalty and discipline that multiparty-ism demands was difficult and it counts for some of the many challenges that Latigo's leadership faced in the 8th Parliament.

Prof. Latigo did not make it to the 9th Parliament after a hotly contested election campaign exercise that saw the military take charge of some parts of the election process leaving him and his supporters crying foul.

After the February 2011 Presidential and Parliamentary elections, Nathan Nandala Mafabi became the seventh Leader of the Opposition, six years after the return of multiparty politics under Museveni's regime. Hon. Mafabi was challenged with leading a minority opposition against a large number of the ruling NRM Members.

In the two years of his tenure however, Hon. Mafabi saw through immense successes especially in legislative product among which were the two hotly contested Bills, i.e. the Public Order Management Bill and the Anti-Money Laundering Bill. Hon. Mafabi was however not able to complete a full five-year term in office. The mandatory review that came after two and a half years saw him leave office amidst high tensions largely played in the media. The media tensions resulted from the FDC Party Presidential race which was hotly contested by Hon. Nandala Mafabi, the Leader of the Opposition and (Rtrd) Major General Mugisha Muntu was declared winner of the race. Mafabi challenged the results through the party structures and the dispute became a hot media issue leading to a difficult era of the leadership in the party.

As the midterm review of the leadership in Parliament, the FDC Party President, Gen. Mugisha Muntu replaced Hon. Mafabi with Hon. Philip Wafula Oguttu, the MP for Bukoli Central to serve in the remaining period of the term.

List of leaders of the opposition

References

7. "Basil Bataringaya, the father of opposition cross-over" https://www.newvision.co.ug/new_vision/news/1300054/basil-bataringaya-father-opposition-cross-overs  March 7, 2012
Government of Uganda
Leaders of the Opposition
Uganda